Caramuru is an epic poem written by Brazilian Augustinian friar Santa Rita Durão. It was published in 1781, and it is one of the most famous Indianist works of Brazilian Neoclassicism – the other being Basílio da Gama's O Uraguai.

Theme 
Inspired by Luís de Camões' The Lusiads, it is divided in ten cantos. The poem tells the story of the famous Portuguese sailor Diogo Álvares Correia, also known as "Caramuru" (Old Tupi for "Son of the Thunder"), who shipwrecked on the shores of present-day Bahia and had to live among the Indians. The poem also alludes to Correia's wife, Catarina Paraguaçu, as a seer, being able to foresee the Dutch invasions of Brazil.

Form 
The poem is written in ottava rima (oitava rima in Portuguese). Lines consist of ten syllables and the strophe rhymes according to the pattern abababcc. Here is the first stanza of the poem. The hero "Filho do Trovão" is introduced in it.

De um varão em mil casos agitados,
Que as praias discorrendo do Ocidente,
Descobriu recôncavo afamado
Da capital brasílica potente;
Do Filho do Trovão denominado,
Que o peito domar soube à fera gente,
O valor cantarei na adversa sorte,
Pois só conheço herói quem nela é forte.

Adaptations
 Caramuru: A Invenção do Brasil, a 2001 Brazilian film directed by Guel Arraes, is a loose, comedic adaptation of Durão's poem.

See also
 Indianism
 Basílio da Gama
 O Uraguai
 Caramuru

References

Criticism 
 “The ancient Portugal reborn in the Brazil”: The myth of Portuguese - Brazilian Empire  in the epic poem  Caramuru  by Santa Rita Durão.
  Belinda Mora García, The Aeneid of Brazil : Caramuru (1781).

1781 books
Brazilian books
Brazilian poems
Epic poems in Portuguese
1781 poems
18th-century Brazilian literature